Leadgate is a village in County Durham, in England. It is situated to the north-east of Consett. The Roman road Dere Street runs straight through the middle of Leadgate, today this is known as Durham Road and the B6309.

The place-name 'Leadgate' is first attested in 1590 and derives from the Old English 'hlidgeat', which means 'swing-gate'.

The parish church of St Ives was built in 1865–68. The Roman Catholic church of Our Blessed Lady and St. Joseph lies a little way out of the village at Brooms. It was built 1866-69 by E. W. Pugin and served the Irish migrant community.

Leadgate was the home of the workers and staff of the Eden colliery which opened in 1844, and was closed on the 18 July 1980. It was also home to many working for the Consett Iron Company (about 2 miles away) and which closed in the 1980s.

Leadgate now stands as a small village with a close-knit community.  Plans to regenerate the area have been on the local councils' planning board for some time and improvements are being made.

The retail economy of Leadgate is centered on Front Street which until the construction of the Leadgate bypass formed one of the main routes from Newcastle into Consett. Front Street hosts a number of independent businesses as well as a local co-operative.

The coast-to-coast cycle route runs through Leadgate and follows the path of the former Stanhope and Tyne railway. The last train ran on the line on 17 March 1984.

St Ives is the Parish Church.

On 17 August 2020 the Bradley open-cast mine, the last coal mine in England, was closed.

References

External links
 
 

Villages in County Durham
Consett